The 71st Indianapolis 500 was held at the Indianapolis Motor Speedway in Speedway, Indiana, on Sunday May 24, 1987. After dominating practice, qualifying, and most of the race, leader Mario Andretti slowed with mechanical problems with only 23 laps to go. Five laps later, Al Unser Sr. assumed the lead, and won his record-tying fourth Indianapolis 500 victory. During the month of May, an unusually high 25 crashes occurred during practice and qualifying, with one driver in particular, Jim Crawford, suffering serious leg injuries.

Al Unser's victory is considered one of the biggest upsets in Indianapolis 500 history. Unser, whose driving career was beginning to wind down, had dropped down to part-time status a year earlier. He entered the 1987 month of May without a ride and without sponsorship money, which left him on the sidelines for the first week of practice. After Danny Ongais suffered a concussion in a practice crash, Unser was hired by Penske to fill the vacant seat. Unser proceeded to win the race with a year-old March chassis, and the venerable Cosworth DFX, the powerplant's tenth consecutive Indy victory. Unser's car, originally entered as a back-up, had been sitting in a hotel lobby in Reading, Pennsylvania, as a show car just weeks prior.

The race was sanctioned by the United States Auto Club, and was included as part of the 1987 CART PPG Indy Car World Series. Of the notable statistics, the 1987 Indy 500 was the first such where the entry list did not include a single car built in the United States.

During the race, a spectator was killed when an errant tire was hit into the grandstand, the first spectator fatality at the event in a racing-related incident since 1938.

Background
Defending Indy 500 winner Bobby Rahal went on to win the 1986 CART championship. During the offseason, his Truesports racing team made a highly publicized switch from the March chassis to the up-and-coming Lola chassis. Truesports, however, stayed with the proven Cosworth engine. Rahal was a strong favorite to repeat as winner.

For 1987, the Ilmor Chevrolet Indy V-8 expanded its participation in Indy car racing. Penske Racing fielded a three-car effort with the powerplant, while resuming its in-house chassis program. The PC-16 chassis was the primary car for the team, but as a backup, three one-year-old March 86C chassis were also entered. Newman/Haas Racing joined the Ilmor Chevrolet program, pairing the engine in a Lola. With it, Mario Andretti scored the engine's first victory a month earlier at Long Beach. Patrick Racing (Emerson Fittipaldi & Kevin Cogan) was the third team to utilize the Ilmor Chevrolet, but they used the 1987 March chassis.

Roberto Guerrero won the second race of the season, held at Phoenix. Guerrero was a rising star on the circuit, and the impressive victory from last starting position at Phoenix made him a favorite for Indy. For 1987, his Vince Granatelli Racing team was sporting a special paint job, a "throwback" day-glow orange which resembled the Andy Granatelli entries from the late 1960s and early 1970s.

A new engine arrived at Indianapolis in 1987. The Judd AV V-8 was badged as the Brabham-Honda, and was fielded by Galles Racing. After part-time use during the 1986 CART season, the engine was utilized full-time beginning in 1987. Indy veteran Geoff Brabham, son of Jack Brabham (co-founder of Engine Developments Ltd.) and rookie Jeff MacPherson were the drivers.

At Penske Racing, Rick Mears and Danny Sullivan returned as the full-time entries. During the offseason, three-time Indy 500 winner (1970, 1971, 1978), and three-time national champion (1970, 1983, 1985) Al Unser Sr. retired from full-time driving duties. Unser had been driving for Penske from 1983 to 1986, and was still interested in driving part-time, particularly at Indianapolis and the other 500-mile races (Michigan and Pocono). Meanwhile, businessman and media mogul Ted Field arranged a deal with Roger Penske to field Indy veteran Danny Ongais in the third Penske entry. Al Unser was unable to secure a ride before the month of May, and arrived at the track unemployed, albeit shopping around for a competitive car.

Goodyear arrived at the Indianapolis Motor Speedway for the first time with a new radial tire. After a few years of development in the CART series, the radials were ready for competition in the Indy 500.

The most noticeable construction project completed at the Indianapolis Motor Speedway for 1987 was a series of electronic dot matrix scoreboards installed around the track.

Race schedule

Practice – week 1

Saturday May 2
Practice started on Opening Day, Saturday May 2. Rookie Ludwig Heimrath Jr. was the first car on the track. A somewhat light day of activity saw several drivers pass their rookie tests. His father Mario, however, did not take any laps.

Sunday May 3
The second day of practice saw increased activity. Later in the day, the weather cooled, and wind picked up. At 5:58 p.m., Pancho Carter suffered a spectacular crash. His car spun in turn three, air got underneath, and flipped upside-down. The car landed on the pavement on its roll bar, and proceeded to skid about  through the North chute. The car hit the outside wall in turn four, and came to a rest still upside-down. Carter, however, was not seriously injured. His helmet had three major scrapes from rubbing along the pavement. Carter later proudly showed off the helmet, showing where he had rotated his head to spread the abrasion damage.

Monday May 4
High winds kept the speeds down. Dennis Firestone and Roberto Guerrero tied for fast lap of the day (211.565 mph), while Mario Andretti was third.

Tuesday May 5
Tuesday saw the fastest lap in Indy history to date. It made him the favorite for the pole position. The next fastest time, turned in by Bobby Rahal was a full  slower. The second crash of the month occurred, involving Dennis Firestone. He spun and crashed in turn four, breaking bones in his left foot and fracturing his left leg, eventually this crash with a second crash would sideline him for the month.

Wednesday May 6
Four crashes occurred during practice on Wednesday. Kevin Cogan drifted high exiting turn 1, and crashed into the outside wall. Later, Scott Brayton hit the wall in turn four. Derek Daly and Dick Ferguson both brushed the wall in the south short chutes, but both nursed their cars back to the pits. None of the four drivers were seriously injured. Cogan, Brayton, and Daly were all driving 1987 March chassis. By mid-week, teams fielding the 1987 March chassis were finding the cars difficult to handle with the new Goodyear radial tires. Coupled with the warmer temperatures, and often windy conditions, many teams were finding the search for speed difficult.

Thursday May 7

Breezy conditions continued on Thursday. The most serious crash of the month to date occurred less than an hour into the day. Danny Ongais, driving the third Penske entry, crashed hard into the outside wall in turn 4. He suffered a concussion and was sidelined for the rest of the month. The crash added to the frustration the Penske team was having so far during the month. While they were having little trouble with the Ilmor Chevrolet engine, the PC-16 chassis was deemed a lemon. Rick Mears and Danny Sullivan were struggling to keep pace, and were rarely amongst the top ten each day on the speed chart. Rocky Moran upped the crash tally for the week to eight, when he crashed exiting turn 2.

Late in the afternoon of May 7, Penske Racing decided to park the PC-16 chassis in favor of their stable of 1986 Marches. However, none were presently at the track, nor immediately race ready. In some cases, they were serving as show cars. The first car would arrive the following morning, and Rick Mears and Danny Sullivan flipped a coin to see who would drive it. Mears won the toss.

"Fast" Friday May 8
The final day of practice before Pole Day was warm and windy. Mario Andretti led the speed chart once again (216.242 mph), but Bobby Rahal was a close second (215.568 mph). Four more crashes occurred, bringing the total for the month to twelve. Tom Sneva crashed exiting turn one. Dick Ferguson crashed for the second time, and suffered major damage. Gary Bettenhausen spun, and Phil Krueger suffered rear suspension damage after tagging the turn four wall.

Time trials – weekend 1

Pole day qualifying – Saturday May 9
Mario Andretti was second-fastest. Stan Fox was involved in the 13th crash of the month, when he spun out of turn three and tapped the inside wall.

Hot, slick, and windy conditions were observed during pole day. Many teams who had struggled during the week with handling problems, sat idle on pole day, waiting for better track conditions.

Over the next hour and a half, five cars started runs, but all were waved off. By 1 p.m., there were still only two cars in the field.

At 1:09 p.m., Mario Andretti took to the track. Andretti's run was "nerve-wracking", inconsistent, and at times he lost traction, but the battle for the pole was settled. After Andretti's run, sparse activity took place until late in the day. Most teams stayed off the track altogether. Veteran drivers, Johnny Rutherford and Dick Simon managed successful runs, and filled the field to five cars.

Jim Crawford, a darkhorse favorite for the front row in a Buick entry, made his first attempt at 2:25 p.m. The crew waved off after a slower-than-expected speed. A little over an hour later, Crawford returned to the track. After a quick warm-up lap, he lost control in turn one, and hit the wall nose-first. He suffered severe injuries, fractures to both ankles, a fractured lower right shin, and a fractured left knee. He would be sidelined for an entire year. Johnny Parsons also brushed the wall in turn 2 during a practice run, upping the total to 15 accidents during the month.

Late in the day, several veterans took to the track in an attempt to qualify. Among the fastest were Roberto Guerrero and Arie Luyendyk. Shortly after 5 p.m., A. J. Foyt qualified in 4th position, extending his streak to a record thirty consecutive Indy 500 races. With reluctance, Danny Sullivan completed a slow qualifying run in his PC-16/Chevrolet. It was a strategic move, in order to secure Sullivan a tentative spot in the field in case time trials were rained out on the second weekend.

At the close of pole day, only eleven cars had completed qualifying runs. With Andretti, Rahal, and Mears taking the top three spots, it was the first time since 1975 that the front row consisted of all former winners (and only the second time ever). With A. J. Foyt qualifying fourth, it was also the first time that former winners swept the top four positions. Rick Mears surprised observers by putting a year-old car (with only two days of shake-down practice) on the outside of the front row, his record seventh front row start. Veteran Dick Simon enjoyed his first start in the front two rows by qualifying 6th. The Ilmor-Chevy Indy V-8 engine won the qualifying battle, placing machines 1st and 3rd, while Cosworth's best car (Rahal) was 2nd.

Second day qualifying – Sunday May 10
Three more crashes occurred on Sunday May 10, lifting the total for the month to 18. The most serious by Tom Sneva, his second crash in three days.

Former winner Gordon Johncock was announced as the replacement for the injured Jim Crawford. Johncock initially retired before the 1985 race, but had tentative plans for a return in 1986. Johncock was expected to immediately begin practicing on the track.

The second day of time trials opened with two attempts, by rookie Ludwig Heimrath Jr. and Rich Vogler. Over an hour and half hour later, more cars lined up to qualify. By the end of the day, the field was filled to 18 cars, with Heimrath the fastest of the afternoon. Among those not yet in the field were Al Unser Jr., Tom Sneva, and Kevin Cogan.

Practice – week 2

Monday May 11
Gordon Johncock took to the track for his first stint of laps at speed. At night, the first significant rain in many days washed the track of some rubber buildup. Mario Andretti (211.714 mph) was the fastest car of the day.

Tuesday May 12
Penske Racing driver Danny Ongais was officially withdrawn from his entry. Following his crash on May 7, Ongais was diagnosed with a concussion, and was not medically cleared to drive. No replacement was yet announced, but Al Unser was rumored as the choice.

Track activity was leisurely, with Mario Andretti leading the speed chart at 212.916 in a back-up car. Rookie Fabrizio Barbazza was the fastest driver not yet qualified at 206.091. Dominic Dobson, another rookie, used the afternoon to finish the final phases of his rookie test.

Wednesday May 13
Three-time Indy 500 winner Al Unser Sr. was officially announced as the replacement for the injured Danny Ongais at Penske Racing. Unser took his first laps of the month, driving a newly arrived 1986 March/Cosworth. Unser had entered the month unemployed, and was at the track supporting his son Al Unser Jr. in his efforts at Doug Shierson Racing, all the while shopping around the garage area for a competitive ride for himself.

Al Unser Jr. had been struggling to get his 1987 March/Cosworth up to speed during the first week of practice, and was unable to qualify during the first weekend of time trials. Unser Sr. had planned to go home to Albuquerque by Monday, if he had not yet secured a ride. But he decided to stay through the week to help his son Unser Jr. get his car up to speed. About a day later, he was approached to drive for Penske.

Al Unser Sr.'s Penske Racing teammate Danny Sullivan started taking laps for the first time in a 1986 March chassis, powered by an Ilmor Chevrolet Indy V-8. Plans were being made to withdraw Sullivan's PC-16/Chevrolet from the qualified field, and re-qualify in the year-old March. Meanwhile, Penske was already prepping a third 1986 March for Unser, but his would be powered by a Cosworth engine.

Late in the day Geoff Brabham broke a wheel, and slid into the wall in turn three. It was the 19th crash of the month.

Thursday May 14
Mario Andretti continued to practice in his back-up car, posting the fourth-fastest speed of the day. Two single-car crashes by Johnny Parsons and Rick Miaskiewicz respectively, brought the total of the month to 21 crashes. Parsons suffered a broken ankle, and was sidelined for the rest of the month.

Friday May 15
The final regular day of practice took place on Friday May 15. Dennis Firestone suffered his second crash in a week, and 22nd overall for the month. In turn four, he slid into the outside wall, suffering a neck fracture and concussion. This would sideline him for the remainder of the month.

Time trials – weekend 2

Third day qualifying – Saturday May 16
The third day of time trials took place on May 16. Several veteran drivers, as well as a couple rookies, completed qualifying runs, and filled the field to 30 cars.

Among the veterans qualifying early on were Al Unser Jr., Gordon Johncock, and Al Unser Sr. Danny Sullivan withdrew his already-qualified PC-16 Chevrolet, and re-qualified with a 1986 March/Chevrolet.

Shortly after, the track closed for the day.

Bump day qualifying – Sunday May 17
The final day of qualifying was held on May 17. At the start of the day, three positions in the starting field were vacant. Chassey's car, a small single-car team, was entered by Lydia Laughrey, a rare female car owner.

Pancho Carter withdrew his qualified car, and re-qualified faster in a backup. Phil Krueger was the third car out on the track, and his first lap would have been fast enough to ultimately make the field. On his second lap, however, he dipped low in turn one, hit the outside wall, then spun and hit the wall again. It was the 24th crash of the month. After the crash, the track stayed mostly quiet until 4:45 p.m.

Steve Chassey made his second attempt to qualify, but again waved off following three, slow, inconsistent laps. Rocky Moran was next, and despite only a  average, he completed his run. Dominic Dobson and Davy Jones (driving for Foyt Racing) then filled the field to 33 cars. Jones in the process, became the fastest rookie qualifier in the field.

With 49 minutes to go before the 6:00 p.m. gun, George Snider took another Foyt back up car and bumped Rocky Moran. It was the fourth Foyt entry to qualify for the field. The move put rookie Dominic Dobson (201.240 mph) on the bubble. Dobson survived attempts by Ed Pimm and Rick Miaskiewicz, and by 5:30 p.m., still clung to the starting field.

Steve Chassey made his third and final allotted attempt. At , he bumped his way into the field by just over 1 mph. Sammy Swindell (201.840 mph) then found himself on the bubble. Ed Pimm, after days of frustration, handling problems, and with the oil light flashing during his run, bumped Swindell out. That move dropped Chassey down to the bubble spot. Over the final twenty minutes, Chassey held on, and the field was set.

Carburetion Day
On Thursday May 21, the final scheduled practice session was held. The weather continued to be hot and dry. Two incidents during the session altered the grid for race day, bringing the total for the month to 25 crashes leading up to the race.

About a half hour into the session, A. J. Foyt, who qualified 4th on the grid, got into turbulence in turn one. He lost control, did a half spin, and crashed hard into the wall. About an hour later, Emerson Fittipaldi, nursing an ill-handling car, spun and crashed in turn three.

Foyt's car was deemed repairable, and he was able to start in his qualified position. Fittipaldi's car, however, was a total loss, and he would be required to start a backup car on race day. He was moved from the 10th starting position to the rear of the field.

Mario Andretti continued his complete dominance of the month, and posted the fastest lap of the day. Likewise, Andretti marched closer towards a clean sweep for the month, guiding his Newman Haas team to a win in the Miller Indy Pit Stop Championship. He beat Bobby Rahal (Truesports racing) in the final round.

Starting grid

† - Emerson Fittipaldi qualified 10th on pole day. On Carburetion Day, he crashed his already-qualified car, and it was damaged beyond repair. The car was replaced with a back-up car, and was moved the rear of the field.

Alternates
First alternate: Sammy Swindell  (#59) – bumped
Second alternate: Dominic Dobson  (#17) – bumped

Failed to Qualify
Rocky Moran (#76) – bumped
Rick Miaskiewicz  (#97) – too slow
Jim Crawford (#2T) – wrecked qualifying on pole day; suffered serious injuries to feet and legs, replaced by Gordon Johncock
Phil Krueger (#10T) – wrecked qualifying on bump day
Danny Ongais (#25) – wrecked in practice; suffered concussion and replaced by Al Unser
Dick Ferguson (#19) - wrecked in practice; car was rebuilt by bump day but never turned a lap at speed
Dennis Firestone (#10) - wrecked in practice, injured
Spike Gehlhausen (#35) - did not attempt to qualify
Johnny Parsons (#91) - wrecked in practice, broken leg

Race summary

Start
Race day dawned warm with clear blue skies. During the pace lap, the car of George Snider caught fire, with a turbocharger failure. Snider pulled into the pits, as the rest of the field took the green flag. Mario Andretti charged from the pole position, and led the field into turn one.

In the first turn of the first lap, Josele Garza was down low on the white line, and lost the back end of the car. Right next to Al Unser, he started spinning. Unser slipped by cleanly, but reported being tagged gently from behind. Garza spun up the track, and collected Pancho Carter. Neither driver was injured, but both cars suffered damage.

First half
On lap 6, the green came back out, with Mario Andretti continuing to lead. Driving at a blistering pace, it took only seven laps for him to start lapping backmarkers. On lap 25, Ludwig Heimrath was running 7th, and made his first pit stop, but one of the wheels was not properly secured. The wheel came off, and he spun in turn four. Under the caution, Mario Andretti pitted, and managed to stay in the lead. Only seven cars remained on the lead lap.

Around the  mark, several cars were dropping out of contention. Kevin Cogan blew an engine, Randy Lewis dropped out with a gearbox failure, and Michael Andretti broke a CV joint, then had a pit fire. On lap 34, Bobby Rahal, who had been running as high as second, made an unscheduled, five-minute long pit stop due to an electrical problem. After several long stops, Rahal would eventually drop out.

Mario Andretti continued to dominate, giving up the lead temporarily only through the sequence of pit stops. Roberto Guerrero and Danny Sullivan consistently were chasing him. Shortly before the halfway point, Rick Mears was forced to the pits with an electrical problem, and would also be forced to drop out.

At the 90 lap mark, Al Unser Sr. had worked up to 4th, and Tom Sneva 5th. Unser had been lapped by Andretti early in the going. At that juncture, he elected to change his strategy and started charging up the standings. Andretti was still dominating, running laps in the low 200 mph range, while most other cars were in the 190 mph range, or slower. Dick Simon was running 7th, but ran the car out of fuel on the backstretch. He lost several laps as he was towed back to the pits, but received fuel, and returned to the track.

Second half
The dominance by Mario Andretti continued in the second half, leading Roberto Guerrero by several seconds. The rest of the field was at least one lap down. Several of the other competitors were falling by the wayside, including A. J. Foyt (who was running 9th) and Rich Vogler. Sullivan and Unser Sr., both in the top 5, were now close to 2 laps down. Meanwhile, Tom Sneva and Arie Luyendyk, clinging to the top eight, both started losing ground to Fabrizio Barbazza.

Spectator fatality

On the 130th lap, Tony Bettenhausen started suffering a handling problem exiting turn two. Down the backstretch, his right-front wheel lug nut may have come off the car, and the wheel began to loosen. In turn three, the wheel came off and began rolling though the north short chute. Second place Roberto Guerrero came up on the wheel suddenly, and hit it with his nosecone. The nosecone cover was broken off, and the wheel was punted high into the air. The wheel cleared the catchfencing, and flew towards the "K" grandstand. Spectators were witnessed fleeing the seating in a "V" shape as the 18-pound wheel headed their direction. The wheel came down and struck 41-year-old Lyle Kurtenbach of Rothschild, Wisconsin in the head, sitting in the top row of the grandstand. He suffered massive head injuries, and was pronounced dead at Methodist Hospital shortly afterwards. The wheel bounded and came to rest in the tunnel underneath the north short chute.

Guerrero slowed, and nursed his car back to the pits. Under the caution flag, the pit crew worked to replace the nosecone, and got Guerrero back on to the track, albeit a lap down. It was not immediately discovered at the time, but striking the tire had damaged the clutch slave cylinder, which was located in the nose. Fluid had begun to leak from the cylinder, which would ultimately render the clutch inoperable. At speed, use of the clutch was unnecessary, but exiting the pits would pose increasing difficulty.

The incident was reported live on the Indianapolis Motor Speedway Radio Network by fourth turn reporter Bob Jenkins. The extent of injury was unknown at the time. The live ABC television broadcast, however, was at commercial when it occurred. During the commercial, the incident was noticed by the producers and commentators. When they returned on-air, however, footage of the incident was not shown, nor were specific details given of what had occurred. Instead, still images of Guerrero's nosecone and pit crew were shown. No further information was given during the remainder of the race. During the post-race coverage, Jim McKay briefly announced on-air that the Associated Press wire service was reporting that a spectator fatality had occurred, but he did not connect the incidents.

Late race
With 25 laps to go, Mario Andretti held a one-lap lead over second place Roberto Guerrero, and an almost two-lap lead over third place Al Unser Sr. The field had dwindled down to only 12 cars running, most of which were many laps down. With Rick Mears and Danny Sullivan both out of the race, Roger Penske took over the pit of Al Unser Sr. As Penske took over Unser's pit stall, Danny Sullivan and Rick Mears stood near Unser's pit stall to watch the race finish and pull for their teammate.

Andretti, Guerrero, and Unser all needed one final fuel stop to make it to the finish. Unser Sr. made his final pit stop first. Roger Penske called Unser into the pits a few laps early, in an effort to "put the pressure on Guerrero" in hopes of moving up to second place.

Andretti, leading by 1 lap, slowed down between turns 3 and 4, allowing Guerrero to pass him. At first it was believed that Andretti was ducking into the pits for his final pit stop. However, after leading 170 of 177 laps, Andretti suddenly slowed down the frontstretch on lap 177. An electrical failure in the fuel metering device, part of the fuel injection system, began flooding the engine with raw fuel. After the race, it was determined that Andretti had begun to back off to protect his lead. His lower revs developed a harmonic imbalance in the engine, which led to a broken valve spring.

The misfortune reinforced the perceived Andretti Curse. Andretti coasted around to the pit area, and the team immediately replaced the spark box and wastegate. Guerrero stormed into the lead, but still had one pit stop remaining. Sitting still in the pit area, the once dominating Andretti started slipping in the standings.

Finish
With twenty laps to go, Roberto Guerrero led second place Al Unser Sr. by almost a full lap. He came upon Unser Sr. in traffic, and decisively put him a lap down on lap 180. Two laps later, Guerrero went to the pits for his final fuel stop. With his clutch failing from the earlier incident, entering and exiting the pits was becoming increasingly difficult. Sometime during the race, Guerrero had also broken third gear. While stopped in the pit box, his car became stuck in gear. When refueling was complete, he attempted to pull out of the pits, but the engine stalled. Unser Sr. was driving through the turn three at the time. The crew refired the engine, and the car started to roll away. With Unser Sr. heading down the mainstretch, Guerrero's car stalled once again. The lifeless car sat on the pit road as Unser Sr. drove by to take the lead.

Guerrero's frenzied crew ran out to the car and pulled it back to the pit. At that point, they simply tried to push start the car, which was successful. Guerrero finally got back on to the track, but by that time, Unser Sr. had put him a full lap down. Meanwhile, Mario Andretti's team had made some hasty repairs, and returned him to the track. After one slow lap, still being scored in the top 8, he returned to the pits for further repairs.

Guerrero spent the next several laps furiously chasing Unser Sr. in an attempt to get his lap back. With 11 laps to go, Unser was slowing his pace as the third place car, rookie Fabrizio Barbazza was momentarily holding him back. Barbazza was trying to avoid going two laps down. Unser's crew asked officials to wave the "blue flag" to order Barbazza to pull over and allow Unser past. Officials waved the blue flag to Barbazza who refused to acknowledge. The issue became moot when Barbazza ducked into the pits for a late pit stop. With 9 laps to go, Guerrero unlapped himself. Meanwhile, Mario Andretti tried once again to get his car back up to speed.

Mario Andretti's second return to the track was also short-lived, and his car stalled. The car coasted to a stop in turn four and brought out the race's final caution on lap 192. The yellow flag bunched up the field, and allowed Guerrero to make up the rest of the lap; he lined up only six cars behind Unser Sr. The green flag came out with four laps to go, and Al Unser Sr. held off Roberto Guerrero by 4.496 seconds, to win his record-tying fourth Indianapolis 500 victory. By leading the final 18 laps, Unser Sr. tied the all-time record for most laps led in Indy 500 competition, and, at 47 years of age, also became the oldest winner of the 500.

Post-race notes

Mario Andretti's dominance of the month, and subsequent failure to achieve victory, was largely unprecedented in modern times. He led the practice speed chart on 11 of the 17 days (he participated in only 13 days), won the pole position, won the pit stop contest, had the fastest leading lap of the race, and led 170 of the first 177 laps. Despite not running at the finish, due to high attrition, Andretti was still credited with 9th place, his 8th top-10 finish at Indy.

Al Unser Sr.'s victory in a year-old car was unusual in the CART era. Just weeks prior to being used in the race, the car had been sitting on display at a Sheraton hotel in Reading, Pennsylvania. The car went from Hertz sponsorship to Cummins after a couple of days. Due to time constraints, proper decals were unavailable in time for qualifying. Unser Sr.'s car was fitted with sentence case "Cummins" decals (the proper form of the company's logo) on the left sidepod - the side most visible, and the side used for most official photographs. All upper case "CUMMINS" decals (an improper rendition of the company's logo) were used on the right sidepod (the side least visible, and seldom photographed).

In post-race interviews, brothers Bobby Unser and Al Unser had a live conversation from the television broadcasting booth to victory circle, with Bobby congratulating his brother Al. It is believed to be the only time brothers were part of the victory lane interview. Bobby was seen in tears of joy as he watched his family celebrate in victory lane, from the broadcast booth. Bobby was in his first race broadcasting the Indy 500 on ABC television (the previous year he was part of the radio network crew).

Two nights before the race, at the Hulman Hundred, Al Unser Sr.'s nephew Robby Unser suffered a broken leg in a crash. Robby listened to the race on the radio at the hospital, while Robby's father Bobby Unser called the race live on ABC Sports.

This was the final Indy 500 for famous spectator Larry Bisceglia of Yuma. He traditionally was the first person in line since 1950, as well as 1948–1949 when he was one of the first in line. Bisceglia died on December 7, 1988.

A little more than two months after the race, the Indianapolis Motor Speedway hosted the opening ceremonies for the Pan Am Games.

Results

Box Score

(2) Indicates 1 bonus point added to race total for pole position & 1 more bonus point added to race total for leading the most laps.

All cars utilized Goodyear Tires

Statistics

CART Standings following the race
Note: Only the top 10 are listed

Broadcasting

Radio
The race was carried live on the IMS Radio Network. This would be the final 500 that featured the familiar crew that worked the race from the mid-1970s to the late-1980s. Paul Page served as the chief announcer for the eleventh and final year (until 2014). It would be Page's fourteenth year overall as part of the network crew. Lou Palmer, who debuted in 1958, had become a fixture of the south pits and victory lane since 1963. The 1987 race would be the final time Palmer reported from the pit area, and the final time he conducted the victory lane winner's interview.

Parnelli Jones joined the crew as the "driver expert." After only one year on the radio crew, Bobby Unser left to become a driver analyst for the ABC television crew. Luke Walton reprised his traditional duty of introducing the starting command during the pre-race; however, he did not have an active role during the race. With four pit reporters now part of the crew, Bob Forbes went back to exclusive duty covering the garage area and track hospital.

Later in the year, Paul Page left NBC Sports and joined ABC in September. As a result, Page left the IMS Radio Network, and ultimately would be replaced as anchor by Lou Palmer for 1988.

Television
ABC Sports carried live flag-to-flag coverage in the United States for the first time on the scheduled race day. Jim McKay served as host, his 20th and final 500 on ABC. Jim Lampley served as announcer for the second and final time. Bobby Unser joined ABC starting in 1987, serving as color commentator alongside Sam Posey. Unser had been working CART series races on NBC (with anchor Paul Page) and had been part of the IMS Radio Network crew in 1986.

Three pit reporters served on the crew: Jack Arute, Al Trautwig, and Jerry Gappens (the future CEO of New Hampshire Motor Speedway). The 1987 race was Gappens' lone appearance at Indy, and Trautwig's assignments primarily focused on features and interviews. The victory lane interview of race winner Al Unser Sr., conducted by Arute, featured a unique moment when Bobby Unser took over and conducted a brief interview with his brother.

The broadcast has re-aired numerous times on ESPN Classic since the mid-2000s.

Quotes

Notes

References

Works cited
1987 Indianapolis 500 Day-By-Day Trackside Report For the Media
Indianapolis 500 History: Race & All-Time Stats – Official Site
1987 Indianapolis 500 Radio Broadcast, Indianapolis Motor Speedway Radio Network

Indianapolis 500 races
Indianapolis 500
Indianapolis 500
Indianapolis
Indianapolis 500